Dundee Beach is a locality in the Northern Territory of Australia, located approximately  southwest of the territory capital of Darwin. 
The 2016 Australian census which was conducted in August 2016 reports that  Dundee Beach had 207 people living within its boundaries.

Geography

Name
Dundee Beach and the other two nearby localities prefixed with the name "Dundee" are named after the sub-divisions with these names.  The name "Dundee" is believed to be derived from the 1986 film, Crocodile Dundee.  The boundaries for Dundee Beach were gazetted on 29 October 1997 with the gazettal being revoked on 3 April 2007 with new boundaries being gazetted on 4 April 2007.

History
Development in the area began in the 1990s, originally as a weekend retreat for Darwin residents. The local economy is still largely dependent on tourism, with fishing being the main attraction. Community services and amenities include a small school established in 1998, a volunteer fire brigade and several sporting and social clubs.

Swivel gun discovery
One of Australia's earliest artifacts of European origin was found by a 13-year-old school boy on Dundee Beach in 2010. Initially believed to be a Portuguese Swivel gun dating from the 1500s, the discovery prompted international media attention and renewed speculation about early Portuguese exploration of Australia prior to the arrival of Captain Cook on the East Coast in 1770.

However this claim has been disputed by the Museum and Art Gallery of the Northern Territory following analysis of sand inside the gun's barrel dating it closer to 1750. The museum instead speculated it was likely dropped overboard by Makassan traders who were known to visit the area to harvest Sea cucumber and trade with local Aboriginal peoples. This indicates the gun was more likely a copy of a Dutch or Portuguese design, manufactured in South East Asia.

Governance
Dundee Beach is located within the federal division of Lingiari, the territory electoral division of Daly and the unincorporated areas of the Northern Territory.  The possibility of Dundee Beach and adjoining localities being included in an expanded Coomalie Shire was discussed in 2009 without any decisive outcome.  However, a  poll of residents carried out in 2012 showed that a majority were in favour of retaining the unincorporated area status.

Currently, the Dundee Progress Association, a volunteer  association, represents the interests of  residents in the locality and those in  Bynoe Harbour (sic), Dundee Downs and Dundee Forest to the organizations including the Northern Territory Government.

References

Beaches of the Northern Territory
Populated places in the Northern Territory
Places in the unincorporated areas of the Northern Territory